Charles Willson Peale (April 15, 1741 – February 22, 1827) was an American painter, American patriot, scientist, inventor, politician, and naturalist.

In 1775, inspired by the American Revolution, Peale moved from his native Maryland to Philadelphia, where he set up a painting studio and joined Sons of Liberty, the Pennsylvania militia, and ultimately the Continental Army under the command of General George Washington, where he participated in active combat against the British Army during the American Revolutionary War.

Peale's portraits of leading figures of the American Revolutionary era are some of the most recognizable and prominent from that era. In 1801, Peale founded what today is the Pennsylvania Academy of Fine Arts in Philadelphia, one of the first American museums. More than two centuries after Peale painted his 1795 portrait Washington at Princeton, the painting sold for $21.5 million, the highest price ever paid for an American portrait.

Early life

Peale was born on April 15, 1741, in Chester, Maryland in pre-Revolutionary British America, the son of Charles Peale (1709–1750) and his wife Margaret Triggs (1709–1791). He had a younger brother, James Peale (1749–1831). He was the brother-in-law of Nathaniel Ramsey, who was a Congress of the Confederation delegate.

Career
Four years after his father's death in 1750, Peale at age 13 became an apprentice to saddle maker Nathan Waters. When he reached maturity, Peale opened his own saddle shop.

In 1764, Peale joined Sons of Liberty, an organization of the Thirteen Colonies that proved influential in organizing and paving the way for the American Revolution. He proved unsuccessful in saddle making as a career and then tried fixing clocks and working with metals, but both of these endeavors also failed. He then took up painting.

Finding that he had a talent for painting, especially portraiture, Peale studied for a time under John Hesselius and John Singleton Copley. John Beale Bordley and friends eventually raised enough money for him to travel to England to take instruction from Benjamin West. Peale studied with West for three years beginning in 1767, afterward returning to America and settling in Annapolis, Maryland. There, he taught painting to his younger brother, James Peale, who in time also became a noted artist.

American Revolution
In 1775, Peale's enthusiasm for the American Revolution and the new national government led him to move from Maryland to Philadelphia, then the national capital, where he began painting portraits of notable Americans and visitors from overseas. His estate, now located at La Salle University in Philadelphia, is now open to public. Peale also recruited troops for the Pennsylvania militia, which ultimately joined with other militias to create the Continental Army, commanded by George Washington. In the Pennsylvania militia, Peale rose to the rank of captain by 1776, after participating in several battles. While in combat, he painted miniature portraits of various officers in the Continental Army. He produced enlarged versions of these in later years. After the Revolutionary War, he served in the Pennsylvania state assembly for a year, from 1779 to 1780, and then returned to painting full-time in Philadelphia.

Peale was a prolific artist. He completed portraits of scores of historic figures, including Benjamin Franklin, John Hancock, Thomas Jefferson, Alexander Hamilton, James Mitchell Varnum, and George Washington. In 1771, Washington sat for a portrait with Peale, and he later sat for six additional sittings. Using the seven portraits he painted of Washington, Peale produced close to 60 portraits of Washington. In January 2005, one of them, Peale's Washington at Princeton sold for $21.3 million, setting a record for the highest price paid for an American portrait.

One of his most celebrated paintings is The Staircase Group (1795), a double portrait of his sons Raphaelle and Titian, is painted in the trompe-l'œil style and appears today in the Philadelphia Museum of Art.

Philadelphia Museum founding
Peale had a great interest in natural history, and organized the first U.S. scientific expedition in 1801. These two major interests combined in his founding of what became the Philadelphia Museum in Philadelphia, later known as Peale's American Museum. It housed a diverse collection of botanical, biological, and archaeological specimens. In 1786, Peale was elected to the American Philosophical Society.

The museum contained a large variety of birds which Peale himself acquired, and in many instances mounted, having taught himself taxidermy. In 1792, Peale initiated a correspondence with Thomas Hall, of the Finsbury Museum, City Road, Finsbury, London proposing to purchase British stuffed items for his museum. Eventually, an exchange system was established between the two, whereby Peale sent American birds to Hall in exchange for an equal number of British birds. This arrangement continued until the end of the century. The Peale Museum was the first to display a mastodon skeleton (which in Peale's time were referred to as mammoth bones; these common names were amended by Georges Cuvier in 1800, and his proposed usage is that employed today) that Peale found in New York State. Peale worked with his son to mount the skeleton for display.

The display of the mammoth bones entered Peale into a long-standing debate between Thomas Jefferson and Comte de Buffon. Buffon argued that Europe was superior to the Americas biologically, which was illustrated through the size of animals found there. Jefferson referenced the existence of these "mammoths" (which he believed still roamed northern regions of the continent) as evidence for a greater biodiversity in America. Peale's display of these bones drew attention from Europe, as did his method of re-assembling large skeletal specimens in three dimensions.

The museum was among the first to adopt Linnaean taxonomy. This system drew a stark contrast between Peale's museum and his competitors who presented their artifacts as mysterious oddities of the natural world.

The museum underwent several moves during its existence. At various times it was located in several prominent buildings including Independence Hall and the original home of the American Philosophical Society.

The museum would eventually fail, in large part because Peale was unsuccessful at obtaining government funding. After his death, the museum was sold to, and split up by, showmen P. T. Barnum and Moses Kimball.

Personal life
In 1762, Peale married Rachel Brewer (1744–1790), with whom he bore ten children, most of them named for Peale's favorite male and female artists. Several of his sons and daughters also pursued careers as painters, including:

 Angelica Kauffman Peale (1775–1853), who was named for Angelica Kauffman, Peale's favorite female painter
 Raphaelle Peale (1774–1825), who some consider to be the first professional American painter of still-life
 Rembrandt Peale (1778–1860), portrait painter, inventor, businessman, museum owner/operator in Baltimore. He founded the Gas Light Company of Baltimore in 1817, now Baltimore Gas and Electric Company (BGE), and was the father of artist Rosalba Carriera Peale.
 Rubens Peale (1784–1865), museum administrator and artist.
 Sophonisba Angusciola Peale (1786–1859), ornithologist. She married Coleman Sellers (1781–1834) in 1805. She was the mother of Coleman Sellers II.
 Titian Ramsay Peale I (1780–1798), ornithologist. He died at the age of 18.

After Rachel's death in 1790, Peale married Elizabeth de Peyster (1765–1804), a descendant of Johannes de Peyster, the next year. With his second wife, he had six additional children, including:

 Charles Linnaeus Peale (1794–1832), who was named for Charles Linnaeus, the Swedish botanist and zoologist
 Elizabeth De Peyster Peale (1802–1857), who married William Augustus Patterson (1792–1833) in 1820
 Franklin Peale (1795–1870), who became the Chief Coiner at the Philadelphia Mint
 Titian Ramsay Peale II (1799–1885), explorer, ornithologist, scientific illustrator, and photographer

In 1805, Peale married Hannah Moore, a Quaker from Philadelphia, who became his third wife. She helped to raise the younger children from his previous two marriages.

Peale's slave, Moses Williams, was also trained in the arts while growing up in the Peale household and later became a professional silhouette artist.

In 1810, Peale purchased a farm in Germantown, where he intended to retire. He named this estate Belfield and cultivated extensive gardens there. After Hannah's death in 1821, Peale lived with his son Rubens and sold Belfield in 1826. Peale died on February 22, 1827, and was buried at St. Peter's Episcopal Church in Philadelphia alongside his wife Elizabeth DePeyster.

Expertise
A Renaissance man, Peale had expertise not only in painting but also in many diverse fields, including carpentry, dentistry, optometry, shoemaking, and taxidermy. In 1802, John Isaac Hawkins patented the second official physiognotrace, a mechanical drawing device, and partnered with Peale to market it to prospective buyers. Peale sent a watercolor sketch of the physiognotrace, along with a detailed explanation, to Thomas Jefferson. The drawing is now held with the Jefferson Papers in the Library of Congress.

Around 1804, Peale obtained the American patent rights to the polygraph from its inventor John Isaac Hawkins, about the same time as the purchase of one by Thomas Jefferson. Peale and Jefferson collaborated on refinements to this device, which enabled a copy of a handwritten letter to be produced simultaneously with the original.

Peale wrote several books. Two of these were An Essay on Building Wooden Bridges (1797) and An Epistle to a Friend on the Means of Preserving Health (1803).

Legacy and honors 
 Three of his sons, Rembrandt Peale, Raphaelle Peale, and Titian Ramsay Peale, became noted artists.
 The World War II cargo Liberty Ship S.S. Charles Willson Peale was named in his honor.

Notable works

See also 
 Peale's Barber Farm Mastodon Exhumation Site
 George Escol Sellers, grandson who was an inventor
 "The New Museum Idea"

References 

Sources
 Lily Bita, Charles Willson Peale, the patriarch "Apodemon Epos" Magazine of European Art Center (EUARCE) of Greece, 2st issue 1997 p. 3

Further reading 
Miller, Lillian B. 1980. The Collected Papers Of Charles Willson Peale And His Family: A Guide and Index to the Microfiche Edition
Miller, Lillian B. (editor). 1983 - 2000 Selected Papers of Charles Willson Peale and His Family Volumes 1-5:  Yale University Press
Ward, David C. 2004 Charles Willson Peale: Art and Selfhood in the Early Republic Berkley, California : University of California Press

External links 

 Reynolda House Museum of American Art: Mr. and Mrs. Alexander Robinson, 1795
 Charles Willson Peale and His World from the Metropolitan Museum of Art
 Peale-Sellers Family Collection at the American Philosophical Society
 Portrait of General David Foreman, Berkshire Museum
 The Winterthur Library Overview of an archival collection on Charles Willson Peale.
 History of Peale at Belfield, now the grounds of La Salle University, Philadelphia, PA
 Union List of Artist Names, Getty Vocabularies. ULAN Full Record Display for Charles Willson Peale. Getty Vocabulary Program, Getty Research Institute. Los Angeles, California.
 James Madison, Bust Portrait Miniature by Peale from the *Rare Book and Special Collection Division at The Library of Congress
Catherine "Kitty" Floyd, Bust Portrait Miniature by Peale from the Rare Book and Special Collection Division at The Library of Congress

1741 births
1827 deaths
18th-century American painters
18th-century American male artists
19th-century American male artists
19th-century American painters
American male painters
American slave owners
American people of English descent
American portrait painters
Burials at St. Peter's churchyard, Philadelphia
Members of the American Philosophical Society
Museum founders
Pennsylvania militiamen in the American Revolution
People of colonial Maryland
People from Queen Anne's County, Maryland
Charles
Sibling artists
Trompe-l'œil artists